Dyella agri is a Gram-negative bacterium from the genus of Dyella which has been isolated from grassland soil.

References

External links
Type strain of Dyella agri at BacDive -  the Bacterial Diversity Metadatabase

Xanthomonadales
Bacteria described in 2017